Lives of the Saints  may refer to:
Hagiography, a biography of a saint or an ecclesiastical leader

Books
 Lives of Saints (Ælfric) a 10th-century series of homilies by Ælfric of Eynsham
 Lives of the Saints (Skarga), a 1570s Polish book
 Butler's Lives of the Saints, a 1750s English collection by Alban Butler
 The Lives of the Saints (Baring-Gould), an 1870s English collection
 Lives of the Saints (Ricci novel), a 1990 novel by Nino Ricci
 The Lives of the Saints (Berridge short story collection), a 1995 collection by Edward Berridge

Films
Lives of the Saints (miniseries), a 2004 TV miniseries
The Lives of the Saints, a 2006 film starring Emma Pierson

See also 
 Acts of the Saints